The Arash (From Iranian Arash) is a series of 122mm unguided artillery rocket developed by Iran. It is a copy of BM-21 Grad. A guided version for the Iranian Defense Ministry was recently (July 2020) tested.

Overview
There are four models for export. Each having different specifications:
Arash 1: Range : 21.5 km, Length : 2.815m, Velocity : 710 m/s
Arash 2: Range : 30 km, Length : 2.815m, Velocity : 1050 m/s
Arash 3: Range : 18 km, Length : 2.050m, Velocity : 720 m/s Also known as Noor.
Arash 4: Range : 40 km, Length : 2.890m, Warhead Types :HE fragmentation, ball steel, mine and fuel air.
The export pages say that Arash 4 has a different launching system than other variants.
All of them are fired from 40 tube launchers.

Operators
 
  Hezbollah

References 

Self-propelled artillery of Iran